San Miguel Canton is a canton of Ecuador, located in the Bolívar Province.  Its capital is the town of San Miguel.  Its population at the 2001 census was 26,747.

Demographics
Ethnic groups as of the Ecuadorian census of 2010:
Mestizo  90.9%
Indigenous  5.2%
White  2.7%
Afro-Ecuadorian  0.8%
Montubio  0.3%
Other  0.1%

Populated places
Balzapamba

References

Cantons of Bolívar Province (Ecuador)